CincoMAS is an international pay television channel owned by Mediaset España. The channel is available in the Americas. It was officially launched on 22 January 2016.

History 
After the international success of Spanish channels such as TVE Internacional, Antena 3 Internacional and Atreseries Internacional, on 2015 Mediaset España decided to launch its own international channel. CincoMAS was launched on January 22, 2016. Distribute the best Mediaset content to the Spanish countries in America. In November 2017, Olympusat added the channel to its VEMOX platform in the United States.

Programming 
Cincomas offers a variety of programming including TV series, entertainment, news, and sports. Including successful programs from Mediaset Spain channel, such as Telecinco and Cuatro.

TV series

Entertainment/reality shows

News Programs

See also
 Mediaset
 Telecinco

References

External links 
 Official website 

 
Channels of Mediaset España Comunicación
2016 establishments